The 2021–22 DePaul Blue Demons women's basketball team represented DePaul University during the 2021–22 NCAA Division I women's basketball season. The Blue Demons were led by thirty-sixth year head coach Doug Bruno and played their home games at the Wintrust Arena as members of the Big East Conference.

Previous season
DePaul finished the 2020–21 season 14–10, 11–5 in Big East play to finish in fourth place. As the fourth seed in the Big East tournament they lost in the Quarterfinals to Villanova. They received an at-large invitation to the WNIT, where they played in the Rockford Regional. They lost in the First Round to Saint Louis and lost their consolation game to Drake.

Roster

Schedule

Source:

|-
!colspan=9 style=| Exhibition

|-
!colspan=9 style=| Regular season

|-
!colspan=12 style=|Big East Women's Tournament

|-
!colspan=9 style="|NCAA tournament

Rankings

See also
2021–22 DePaul Blue Demons men's basketball team

References

DePaul Blue Demons women's basketball seasons
DePaul
Depaul
Depaul
DePaul